There have been three baronetcies created for persons with the surname Bellingham, one in the Baronetage of England, one in the Baronetage of Ireland and one in the Baronetage of Great Britain. As of 2014 one creation is extant.

The Bellingham Baronetcy, of Hilsington in the County of Westmorland, was created in the Baronetage of England on 30 May 1620 for Henry Bellingham, Member of Parliament for Westmorland. He was succeeded by his son, the second Baronet, who also sat as Member of Parliament for Westmorland. On his death in 1650 the baronetcy became extinct.

The Bellingham Baronetcy, of Dubber in the County of Dublin, was created in the Baronetage of Ireland on 18 March 1667 for Daniel Bellingham, Deputy Receiver-General and Vice-Treasurer of Ireland and Lord Mayor of Dublin. He was succeeded by his son, the second Baronet. He was Sheriff of County Dublin in 1684. He was childless and on his death in 1699 the title became extinct.

The Bellingham Baronetcy, of Castle Bellingham, in the County of Louth, was created in the Baronetage of Great Britain on 19 April 1796 for William Bellingham, Member of Parliament for Reigate and private secretary to William Pitt the Younger, with remainder to the heirs male of his father Colonel Alan Bellingham. He was a great-great-grandson of Henry Bellingham, younger brother of the first Baronet of the 1667 creation.

Bellingham died childless and was succeeded according to the special remainder by his nephew, the second Baronet. He was the son of Alan Bellingham. The second Baronet was succeeded by his son, the third Baronet. He was Sheriff of County Louth in 1829. On his death the title passed to his son, Sir Henry Bellingham, the fourth Baronet. He was Member of Parliament for County Louth and Lord-Lieutenant of County Louth. He was succeeded by his son Sir Edward Bellingham, the 5th Baronet. He was Brigadier-General in the British Army, a Senator of the Irish Free State and Lord-Lieutenant of County Louth. He died without male issue and was succeeded by his nephew, Sir Roger Bellingham, the sixth Baronet (the son of Captain Roger Charles Noel Bellingham, second son of the fourth Baronet). His sons became the seventh and eighth Baronets respectively in 1973 and 1999. On the death of the eighth in 2015, his son became the ninth and current Baronet.

Two other members of the family may also be mentioned. Alice Sophie, daughter of the third Baronet, was the wife of Sir Victor Brooke, 3rd Baronet. She was the mother of Field Marshal The 1st Viscount Alanbrooke and the grandmother of The 1st Viscount Brookeborough. The Conservative politician Henry, Lord Bellingham (Henry Bellingham) is the great-great-great-grandson of John Bellingham, younger brother of the second Baronet, and is consequently in special remainder to the baronetcy.

The family surname is pronounced "Bellinjum". This is dependent on location within the British Isles, with some parts, particularly in Northumberland, where it is 'Bellinjum', most other areas pronounce the name 'Bellingham'.

The family seat was Castle Bellingham, near the village of Castlebellingham (formerly Gernonstown), County Louth. It passed out of the family soon after the death of the fifth Baronet, with a two-day contents sale in 1957 and the sale and beak-up of the estate in 1958 by the Land Commission.

Bellingham baronets, of Hilsington (1620–1650)

Sir Henry Bellingham, 1st Baronet (d. 1650)
Sir James Bellingham, 2nd Baronet (1623–1650)

Bellingham baronets, of Dubber (1667–1699)
Sir Daniel Bellingham, 1st Baronet (c. 1620–1672)
Sir Richard Bellingham, 2nd Baronet (1648–1699)

Bellingham baronets, of Castle Bellingham (1796)
Sir William Bellingham, 1st Baronet (c. 1756–1826)
Sir Alan Bellingham, 2nd Baronet (1776–1827)
Sir Alan Edward Bellingham, 3rd Baronet (1800–1889)
Sir (Alan) Henry Bellingham, 4th Baronet (1846–1921)
Sir Edward Henry Charles Patrick Bellingham, 5th Baronet (1879–1956)
Sir Roger Carroll Patrick Stephen Bellingham, 6th Baronet (1911–1973)
Sir Noel Peter Roger Bellingham, 7th Baronet (1943–1999)
Sir Anthony Edward Norman Bellingham, 8th Baronet (1947–2015)
Sir William Alexander Noel Bellingham, 9th Baronet (b. 1991)

The current heir presumptive is Alan Hall Bellingham (b. 1960), a cousin of the present holder.

Notes

References 
Kidd, Charles, Williamson, David (editors). Debrett's Peerage and Baronetage (1990 edition). New York: St Martin's Press, 1990, 

Baronetcies in the Baronetage of Great Britain
Extinct baronetcies in the Baronetage of England
Extinct baronetcies in the Baronetage of Ireland
1620 establishments in England
1667 establishments in Ireland
1796 establishments in Great Britain
Baronetcies created with special remainders